Milan Kujundžić (born 27 April 1957) is a Croatian physician and politician who served as Minister of Health in the Cabinet of Andrej Plenković between 2016 and 2020.

Career 
Kujundžić was born in the village of Ivanbegovina near Imotski, Croatia. He graduated from the University of Zagreb School of Medicine in 1982 and obtained his Ph.D. in medicine in 1992.

Since 2005, Kujundžić serves as a head-master of Clinical Hospital Dubrava.

Political career 
From 2004 to 2005, Kujundžić served as assistant of the Minister of Health and Social Welfare.

A longtime member of Croatian Democratic Union (HDZ), he resigned from the party following his defeat in party chairmanship election in May 2012, which was won by Tomislav Karamarko. Kujundžić then founded a right-wing political party Croatian Dawn, established in July 2013 but returned to HDZ in 2016.

In 2012, Kujundžić was a candidate for the president of the Croatian Democratic Union, and in the 20 May 2012 election he came in second after Tomislav Karamarko. In the presidential election in 2014, he was a candidate for the president, but was defeated with conquered 6.3 percent of the vote.

See also 
 Cabinet of Andrej Plenković

References

External links 
 

1957 births
Living people
People from Imotski
Croatian Democratic Union politicians
Croatian physicians
Croatian Democratic Party politicians
Candidates for President of Croatia
Croatian Dawn – Party of the People politicians
Health ministers of Croatia